This is a list of famous people from İzmir, Turkey.

 Rita Abatzi (1914–1969) – Greek rebetiko singer
 Kayahan Açar (1949–2015), singer, composer and lyricist
 Sezen Aksu – (born 1954), Turkish singer–songwriter, musician, record producer; born in Sarayköy, Denizli and raised in central İzmir
 Ekrem Akurgal – (1911–2002), Turkish archaeologist born in Tulkarem, explorer of Old Smyrna, Pitane, Phocaea and Erythrai
 Furkan Aldemir – Turkish basketball player
 Bahadır Alkım (1915–1981), archaeologist
 George K. Anderson – U.S. Air Force general
 Necati Ateş – Turkish soccer player
 Alexander Balas – ruler of the Greek Seleucid kingdom in 150–146 BC
 Édouard Balladur – (born 1929), former French Prime Minister
 Halil Berktay – (born 1947), Turkish historian
 Haluk Bilginer (born 1954), theater and film actor
 Can Bonomo – Turkish singer of Sephardic Jewish descent; represented Turkey in the Eurovision Song Contest 2012
 Mahir Çağrı – Turkish Internet phenomenon
 Olcay Çakır – Turkish  basketball player
 Demetrios Capetanakis (1912–1944) – Greek poet, essayist and critic
 Anton Christoforidis (1918–1985) – Greek light heavyweight boxer
 Salvator Cicurel (1893–1975) – Egyptian Olympic fencer and Jewish community leader
 Hüsamettin Cindoruk – (born 1933), Turkish politician, former party leader and Speaker of the Parliament
 Mehmet Culum – Turkish novelist born in Çeşme who worked in İzmir as an IT specialist
 Necati Cumalı – Turkish novelist born in Florina, raised in nearby Urla
 Meltem Cumbul – (born 1969), actress
 Cybele (1888–1978), Greek actress
 Anestis Delias (1912–1941), Greek bouzouki player, rebetiko composer and singer
 Michel Elefteriades – Greek-Lebanese composer, producer, politician, and Emperor of Nowheristan
 Stéphan Elmas (1862–1937)- Armenian composer and pianist
 Nehir Erdoğan – (born 1980), actress
 Gül Gölge – (born 1981), TV show host, model and actress
 Homer – Greek epic poet
 Attilâ İlhan – Turkish poet, novelist, essayist, journalist, and reviewer
 İsmet İnönü – (1884–1973), second President of Turkey
 Irenaeus (2nd–3rd century) – theologian, bishop of Lugdunum
 Sir Alec Issigonis – (1906–1988), Greek-British car designer whose most famous work is the Mini
 Manolis Kalomiris (1883–1962) – Greek composer
 Selâhattin Kantar – Turkish archaeologist who pioneered Smyrna excavations
 Semih Kaplanoğlu (born 1963), film director, screenwriter and filmproducer
 Semih Kaya – Turkish soccer player
 Erkut Kızılırmak (born 1969), author
 Vedat Kokona – Albanian writer and translator
 Adamantios Korais (1748–1833) – Greek humanist scholar
 Çağla Kubat – (born 1978), Turkish fashion model
 Alex Manoogian – Armenian-American industrialist; philanthropist; founder and CEO of MASCO Corporation
 Darío Moreno – Turkish-Jewish singer who made a career in France
 James Justinian Morier – (1780–1849), British diplomat, traveler and writer
 Magali Noël – (1931–2015), French actress and singer
 Metin Oktay – Turkish soccer player
 Aristotle Onassis (1906–1975) – Greek tycoon
 Alpay Özalan – Turkish soccer player
 Hüsnü Özyeğin (born 1944), banker
 Leonidas Paraskevopoulos (1860–1936) – Greek military man and politician
 Ambrosios Pleianthidis, (1872–1922), metropolitan bishop
 Polycarp – overseer of a Christian congregation
 Giacomo Pylarini – gave the first smallpox inoculation outside of Turkey
 Ahmed Adnan Saygun – Turkish composer, musician and writer
 Giorgos Seferis (1900–1971) – Greek poet; Nobel laureate; born in nearby Urla
 Quintus Smyrnaeus – Greek epic poet
 Yavuz Tatış – (born 1947), private collector
 Yıldız Tilbe – (born 1966), musician and pop singer
 Tryfon Tzanetis (1918–2001) – Greek footballer and coach
 Bilge Umar – Turkish jurist and writer 
 Latife Uşşaki (1898–1976), wife of Mustafa Kemal Atatürk
 Birsel Vardarlı – Turkish  basketball player
 Sabbatai Zevi – (1626–1676), self-proclaimed messiah and founder of the community of Sabbateans

References

 
Izmir